Pelates, is a genus of fish in the family Terapontidae, containing 3 species in it.

Species 
 Pelates octolineatus (Jenyns, 1840) (western striped trumpeter)
 Pelates qinglanensis (Sun, 1991)
 Pelates quadrilineatus (Bloch, 1790) (Fourlined terapon)

The Eastern striped grunter (Helotes sexilineatus) is sometimes placed in the genus Pelates.

References 

Terapontidae
Perciformes genera
Taxa named by Georges Cuvier